The Groninger Museum is an art museum in the city of Groningen in the Netherlands. The museum exhibits modern and contemporary art of local, national, and international artists.

The museum opened in 1874. The current post-modernist building consists of three main pavilions designed individually by architects Philippe Starck, Alessandro Mendini, Coop Himmelb(l)au, and was completed in 1994.

Since 2008, it has had 173,000 to 292,000 visitors per year, the highest amount of any museum in the province of Groningen.

History 

The Groninger Museum was founded in 1874 and opened its own building twenty years later on the Praediniussingel, in 1894. The Menkemaborg, a historic mansion, was donated to the Groninger Museum by the heirs of its last inhabitants in 1921. The current building of the museum was opened in 1994.

Building 

The radically modernist structures that form the Groninger Museum stand in a canal opposite Groningen railway station. They consist of three main pavilions: a silver cylindrical building designed by Philippe Starck, a yellow tower by Alessandro Mendini, and a pale blue deconstructivist space by Coop Himmelb(l)au. A bridge that connects the museum to the train station is part of a cycling and walking path to the centre of the city.

The architecture's futuristic and colourful style echoes the Italian Post Modern designs of the Memphis Group. Mendini, a former member of the firm, who is noted for his furniture and industrial designs, was asked by museum director Frans Haks in 1990 to design the new museum. Haks wanted something extravagant and insisted on non-architects to create the conceptual studies. American artist Frank Stella was originally approached to design one of the pavilions. However, his plan turned-out to be too expensive because he wanted his structure completely built out of Teflon. The municipality then invited Coop Himmelb(l)au to replace him for the commission.

The museum was mainly paid for by GasTerra, the Dutch national natural gas company. The company was celebrating its 25th anniversary and wanted to give the city of Groningen a present. Haks, wanting to move out of the old and insufficient exhibition space, suggested a new museum building. GasTerra agreed to Hak's proposal and granted 25 million guilders for the project.

Alderman Ypke Gietema, a strong proponent of the new museum, was responsible for siting the museum at its present location despite acrimonious objections. During site preparation, protesters managed to halt construction for one year via the high court. Citizens' objections centred on the controversial design, fearing their homes would not sell with such a peculiar and eccentric structure nearby. Despite the controversy, building resumed in 1992 and it was completed in 1994. Local residents had to get used to the shapes and colours of the building, but it soon became a popular success.

Exhibitions 

The Groninger Museum is home to various exhibitions of local, national, and international works of art, most of them modern and abstract. Some have provoked controversy, such as the photo exhibition of Andres Serrano, but others are more conventional such as the exhibition of the works by Ilya Repin, the "Russian Rembrandt". While the exhibition "David Bowie is" was taking place at the museum the death of David Bowie was announced. The museum responded by opening a condolence register and opening its doors to visitors on Monday (while the museum is normally closed).

2002
 Ilya Repin

2006
 Marc Quinn, Recent Sculpture

2007
 Akseli Gallen-Kallela (1865–1931), the Spirit of Finland
 P. Struycken, Digital Paradise

2008
 Russian Legends, Folk Tales and Fairy Tales
 The circle around Kirchner. Expressionismus aus den Bergen
 Ancient Bronzes: Masterpieces from the Shanghai Museum
 Go China! Assen - Groningen

2009
 Asian Ceramics
 Cuba: Art and History from 1868 to the Present
 From Herman Collenius to Jeff Koons, courtesy of the Vereniging Rembrandt
 J.W. Waterhouse (1849–1917), the Modern Pre-Raphaelite

2010
 Now in the former Groninger Museum - 100 years of collecting (1894–1994)
 Bernhard Willhelm & Jutta Kraus
 Brücke, German Expressionism (1905–1913)
 Folkert de Jong

2011
 The Unknown Russia
 Me, myself and I by Chi Peng
 Silver in Groningen
 The Firebird by Othilia Verdurmen
 Highlights From The Museum Collection

2012
 Yin Xiuzhen
 Painting Canada
 Iris van Herpen
 Iconen van het Groningerland. Jan Altink (1885-1971) (Icons of the Groningen Countryside. Jan Altink (1885-1971))
 Famille Verte
 Azzedine Alaïa in de 21e eeuw (Azzedine Alaïa in the 21st Century)
 Eigen collectie - Oude en nieuwe portretten (Old and new portraits from the Groninger Museum collection)
 Studio Job & het Groninger Museum (Studio Job & the Groninger Museum)
 Bijzondere huwelijkslepels uit de middeleeuwen

2013
 Diane KW. At World's End
 Draken en lange Lijzen. Chinees Porselein uit de eigen collectie (Dragons and Lange Lijzen. Chinese porcelain from the Museum's own collection)
 Vrouwen van de Revolutie (Women of the Revolution)
 Nordic Art 1880 - 1920
 Groninger Museum eert grondlegger (Groninger Museum honours founder)
 Marc Bijl. Urban Gothic
 Gronings zilver uit de collectie Hofman-Westerhof (Gronings silver from the Hofman-Westerhof collection)
 De Ploeg - Eigen collectie (De Ploeg - Groninger Museum Collection)

2015
 H.N. Werkman
 David Bowie is

2016
Rodin

2017

2019 
Strijd! 100 jaar vrouwenkiesrecht / Battle! 100 years of women's suffrage

Administration 

Andreas Blühm has been the museum director of the Groninger Museum since 2012.

The Groninger Museum is a member of Museumhuis Groningen (Groningen Museum House), which is an umbrella organization for museums and heritage institutions in the province of Groningen.

Since 2008, the museum has had between 180,000 and 292,000 visitors per year, with the exception of 2010, when the museum was closed for renovation from April to December. In 2016, the museum had 290,000 visitors. It is the most visited museum of the province of Groningen.

References

External links

 , official website

1874 establishments in the Netherlands
Art museums and galleries in the Netherlands
Art museums established in 1874
Buildings and structures in Groningen (city)
Deconstructivism
Coop Himmelblau
Modern art museums
Museums in Groningen (province)
19th-century architecture in the Netherlands